Brigadier General Joseph J. McMenamin was a general officer in the United States Marine Corps and was the Assistant Division Commander for the 2nd Marine Division.

Early years
McMenamin is a 1970 graduate of La Salle College High School in Wyndmoor, Pennsylvania.  
He received a Bachelor of Arts degree in political science from Villanova University in May 1974.

Marine Corps service
McMenamin was commissioned a second lieutenant in the Marine Corps via the Naval Reserve Officer Training Corps program.

Completing The Basic School in December 1974, he was assigned to 2nd Battalion, 9th Marines, 3rd Marine Division, Okinawa, Japan where he served as the 81mm Mortar Platoon Commander and Headquarters & Service Company Executive Officer. Returning from Okinawa in February 1976, he was assigned to Marine Corps Recruit Depot San Diego, where he served as a series officer, battalion adjutant and regimental adjutant.

In October 1979, he transferred to the 1st Marine Division, Camp Pendleton, California where he served as the weapons company commander and the battalion fire support coordinator with the 2nd Battalion, 7th Marines for 3 years. Following this tour, he attended Amphibious Warfare School at Quantico, Virginia.

After completing Amphibious Warfare School, McMenamin reported to The Basic School, where he served as a tactics instructor, tactics section chief, student company commander and assistant tactics group chief. Selected for recruiting duty, he served as the commanding officer of Recruiting Station, Cincinnati, Ohio from June 1986 to June 1989. After recruiting duty, he attended Marine Corps Command and Staff College. Completing school in June 1990, he then served an air-ground exchange tour with the 1st Marine Aircraft Wing in Okinawa, Japan.

Returning to the United States in July 1991, he was initially assigned as the G-3 Training Officer of the 2nd Marine Division, Camp Lejeune, North Carolina. He later assumed command of the 2nd Light Armored Reconnaissance Battalion in July 1992. Completing this assignment in February 1994, he completed his tour with the 2nd Marine Division as the assistant chief of staff, readiness. Following his tour with the 2nd Marine Division, he attended the Naval War College in June 1994. Graduating with a Master of Arts degree in strategic studies and national security affairs in May 1995, he reported for joint duty with the United States Central Command serving as the Strategy Branch Chief and Division Chief, Policy and Strategy Division in the J-5 Plans and Policy Directorate.

In June 1999, he reported for duty as the commanding officer of the Sixth Marine Corps District. Brigadier General McMenamin relinquished command of the Sixth Marine Corps District on June 26, 2001. He served as the commanding general, Marine Corps Recruit Depot Parris Island, South Carolina from June 27, 2001, until May 25, 2004. In June 2004 he was assigned as the director, Iraq Survey Group, Baghdad, Iraq. He assumed duties as the assistant division commander of 2nd Marine Division during December 2004.

Awards and decorations
Brigadier General McMenamin's military decorations include:

External links

USMC Biography

People from Springfield Township, Montgomery County, Pennsylvania
Recipients of the Legion of Merit
United States Marine Corps generals
Villanova University alumni
Year of birth missing (living people)
Living people
Recipients of the Defense Superior Service Medal
Recipients of the Humanitarian Service Medal
Military personnel from Pennsylvania